Matthieu Gauzin (born 27 February 2001) is a French professional basketball player for BCM Gravelines-Dunkerque of the LNB Pro A.

Early life and career
Gauzin grew up in Bourges and played tennis until he was eight years old. He started playing basketball with CJM Bourges and joined Le Mans Sarthe at age 15.

Professional career
On 22 May 2019, Gauzin signed a three-year professional contract with Le Mans Sarthe of the LNB Pro A. He became the youngest player to sign with the club since Nicolas Batum. He made his senior debut in a 21 September loss to Boulazac, scoring four points in 16 minutes. On 27 November, he announced that he would not enter the 2020 NBA draft, despite being considered a potential second-round pick at the time, because he felt that he was "not ready." In 15 games in his first season, Gauzin averaged 1.5 points per game.

On 3 June 2020, Gauzin was loaned to Champagne Châlons-Reims of the Pro A for the following season.

On May 31, 2022, he has signed with BCM Gravelines-Dunkerque of the LNB Pro A.

National team career
Gauzin represented France at the 2018 FIBA Under-17 Basketball World Cup in Argentina, averaging eight points per game in a bench role and helping his team win the silver medal. At the 2019 FIBA U18 European Championship in Volos, Greece, he averaged 10.7 points and 2.8 steals per game, helping France to a fifth-place finish.

References

External links
Matthieu Gauzin International Stats at Basketball-Reference.com

2001 births
Living people
BCM Gravelines players
French men's basketball players
Le Mans Sarthe Basket players
Sportspeople from Bourges
Point guards